The 12th Pan American Games were held in Mar del Plata, Argentina from March 11 to March 26, 1995.

Medals

Silver

Men's 200 metres: Andrew Tynes
Women's Javelin: Laverne Eve

Bronze

Women's Long Jump: Jackie Edwards

Results by event

See also
Bahamas at the 1996 Summer Olympics

Nations at the 1995 Pan American Games
1995
Pan American Games